The shipworms are marine bivalve molluscs in the family Teredinidae: a group of saltwater clams with long, soft, naked bodies. They are notorious for boring into (and commonly eventually destroying) wood that is immersed in sea water, including such structures as wooden piers, docks and ships; they drill passages by means of a pair of very small shells (“valves”) borne at one end, with which they rasp their way through. Sometimes called "termites of the sea", they also are known as "Teredo worms" or simply Teredo (from  via ). Carl Linnaeus assigned the common name Teredo  to the best-known genus of shipworms in the 10th edition of his taxonomic magnum opus, Systema Naturæ (1758).

Description

Removed from its burrow, the fully grown teredo ranges from several centimetres to about a metre in length, depending on the species. The body is cylindrical, slender, naked and superficially vermiform, meaning "worm-shaped". In spite of their slender, worm-like forms, shipworms possess the characteristic morphology of bivalves. The ctinidia lie mainly within the branchial siphon, through which the animal pumps the water that passes over the gills.

The two siphons are very long and protrude from the posterior end of the animal. Where they leave the end of the main part of the body, the siphons pass between a pair of calcareous plates called pallets. If the animal is alarmed, it withdraws the siphons and the pallets protectively block the opening of the tunnel.

The pallets are not to be confused with the two valves of the main shell, which are at the anterior end of the animal. Because they are the organs that the animal applies to boring its tunnel, they generally are located at the tunnel's end. They are borne on the slightly thickened, muscular anterior end of the cylindrical body and they are roughly triangular in shape and markedly concave on their interior surfaces. The outer surfaces are convex and in most species are deeply sculpted into sharp grinding surfaces with which the animals bore their way through the wood or similar medium in which they live and feed. The valves of shipworms are separated and the aperture of the mantle lies between them. The small "foot" (corresponding to the foot of a clam) can protrude through the aperture.

The shipworm lives in waters with oceanic salinity. Accordingly, it is rare in the brackish Baltic Sea, where wooden shipwrecks are preserved for much longer than in the oceans.

The range of various species has changed over time based on human activity.  Many waters in developed countries that had been plagued by shipworms were cleared of them by pollution from the Industrial Revolution and the modern era; as environmental regulation led to cleaner waters, shipworms have returned.  Climate change has also changed the range of species; some once found only in warmer and more salty waters like the Caribbean have established habitats in the Mediterranean.

Kuphus polythalamia
The longest marine bivalve, Kuphus polythalamia, was found from a lagoon near Mindanao island in the southeastern part of the Philippines, which belongs to the same group of mussels and clams. The existence of huge mollusks was established for centuries and studied by the scientists, based on the shells they left behind that were the size of baseball bats (length 1.5 meters (5 ft.), diameter 6 cm (2.3 in.) ). The bivalve is a rare creature that spends its life inside an elephant tusk-like hard shell made of calcium carbonate. It has a protective cap over its head which it reabsorbs to burrow into the mud for food. The case of the shipworm is not just the home of the black slimy worm. Instead, it acts as the primary source of nourishment in a non-traditional way.

K. polythalamia sifts mud and sediment with its gills. Most shipworms are relatively smaller and feed on rotten wood. This shipworm instead relies on a beneficial symbiotic bacteria living in its gills. The bacteria use the hydrogen sulfide for energy to produce organic compounds  that in turn feed the shipworms, similar to the process of photosynthesis used by green plants to convert the carbon dioxide in the air into simple carbon compounds.

Scientists found that K. polythalamia cooperates with different bacteria than other shipworms, which could be the reason why it evolved from consuming rotten wood to living on hydrogen sulfide in the mud.  The internal organs of the shipworm have shrunk from lack of use over the course of its evolution The scientists are planning to study the microbes found in the single gill of K. polythalamia to find a new possible antimicrobial substance

Biology
When shipworms bore into submerged wood, bacteria (Teredinibacter turnerae), in a special organ called the gland of Deshayes, digest the cellulose exposed in the fine particles created by the excavation.
The excavated burrow is usually lined with a calcareous tube. The valves of the shell of shipworms are small separate parts located at the anterior end of the worm, used for excavating the burrow.

Taxonomy
Shipworms are marine animals in the phylum Mollusca, order Bivalvia, family Teredinidae. They were included in the now obsolete order Eulamellibranchiata, in which many documents still place them.

Ruth Turner of Harvard University was the leading 20th century expert on the Teredinidae; she published a detailed monograph on the family, the 1966 volume "A Survey and Illustrated Catalogue of the Teredinidae" published by the Museum of Comparative Zoology. More recently, the endosymbionts that are found in the gills have been subject to study the bioconversion of cellulose for fuel energy research.

Genera
Shipworm species comprise several genera, of which Teredo is the most commonly mentioned. The best known species is Teredo navalis.  Historically, Teredo concentrations in the Caribbean Sea have been substantially higher than in most other salt water bodies.

Genera within the family Teridinidae include:
 Bactronophorus Tapparone-Canefri, 1877
 Bankia Gray, 1842
 Dicyathifer Iredale, 1932
 Kuphus Guettard, 1770
 Lithoredo Shipway, Distel & Rosenberg, 2019
 Lyrodus Binney, 1870
 Nausitoria Wright, 1884
 Neoteredo Bartsch, 1920
 Nototeredo Bartsch, 1923
 Psiloteredo Bartsch, 1922
 Spathoteredo Moll, 1928
 Teredo Linnaeus, 1758
 Teredora Bartsch, 1921
 Teredothyra Bartsch, 1921
 Uperotus Guettard, 1770
 Zachsia Bulatoff & Rjabtschikoff, 1933

Engineering concerns
Shipworms greatly damage wooden hulls and marine piling, and have been the subject of much study to find methods to avoid their attacks.  Copper sheathing was used on wooden ships in the latter 18th century and afterwards, as a method of preventing damage by "teredo worms". The first historically documented use of copper sheathing was experiments held by the British Royal Navy with HMS Alarm, which was coppered in 1761 and thoroughly inspected after a two-year cruise. In a letter from the Navy Board to the Admiralty dated 31 August 1763 it was written "that so long as copper plates can be kept upon the bottom, the planks will be thereby entirely secured from the effects of the worm."

In the Netherlands the shipworm caused a crisis in the 18th century by attacking the timber that faced the sea dikes. After that the dikes had to be faced with stones. In 2009, Teredo have caused several minor collapses along the Hudson River waterfront in Hoboken, New Jersey, due to damage to underwater pilings.

Engineering

In the early 19th century, engineer Marc Brunel observed that the shipworm's valves simultaneously enabled it to tunnel through wood and protected it from being crushed by the swelling timber. With that idea, he designed the first tunnelling shield, a modular iron tunnelling framework which enabled workers to tunnel through the unstable riverbed beneath the Thames. The Thames Tunnel was the first successful large tunnel built under a navigable river.

Literature
Henry David Thoreau's poem "Though All the Fates" pays homage to "New England's worm" which, in the poem, infests the hull of "[t]he vessel, though her masts be firm".  In time, no matter what the ship carries or where she sails, the shipworm "her hulk shall bore,/[a]nd sink her in the Indian seas".

The hull of the ship wrecked by a whale, inspiring Moby Dick, had been weakened by shipworms.

In the Norse Saga of Erik the Red, Bjarni Herjólfsson, said to be the first European to discover the Americas, had his ship drift into the Irish Sea where it was eaten up by shipworms. He allowed half the crew to escape in a smaller boat covered in seal tar, while he stayed behind to drown with his men.

Cuisine 

In Palawan and Aklan in the Philippines, the shipworm is called  and is eaten as a delicacy. It is prepared as kinilaw—that is, raw (cleaned) but marinated with vinegar or lime juice, chopped chili peppers and onions, a process very similar to ceviche. The taste of the flesh has been compared to a wide variety of foods, from milk to oysters. Similarly, the delicacy is harvested, sold, and eaten from those taken by local natives in the mangrove forests of West Papua, Indonesia and the central coastal peninsular regions of Thailand near Ko Phra Thong.

See also
 Gribble
 Bug shoe

References

Further reading 
Borges, L. M. S., et al. (2014). Diversity, environmental requirements, and biogeography of bivalve wood-borers (Teredinidae) in European coastal waters. Frontiers in Zoology 11:13.
 Powell A. W. B., New Zealand Mollusca, William Collins Publishers Ltd, Auckland, New Zealand 1979

External links 
 

 
Herbivorous animals
Nautical terminology
Taxa named by Constantine Samuel Rafinesque